They Went That-A-Way & That-A-Way is a 1978 slapstick comedy film co-directed by Stuart E. McGowan and Edward Montagne and written by and starring Tim Conway.

Premise
Dewey and Wallace are small-town lawmen who are ordered by the governor to go undercover as prison inmates to find out where a gang of thieves have hidden their loot. While they're undercover, however, the governor dies, and because no one else knows about the ruse Dewey and Wallace are stranded in prison.

Home media
The film was released on DVD by MGM Home Entertainment on October 8, 2002, as part of a double feature with The Longshot, another Tim Conway movie.

The film was released on Blu-ray by Kino Lorber August 16th, 2022.

Notes
Richard Kiel, who stars in the film as the character "Duke," played an identical role in an episode of the 1980s TV series, "The Fall Guy," episode "That's Right, We're Bad."

External links
 
 
 
 
 

1978 films
American slapstick comedy films
1978 comedy films
Films directed by Edward Montagne
1970s English-language films
1970s American films